Yainville is a commune in the Seine-Maritime department in the Normandy region in north-western France.

Geography
A car ferry service connects the commune with Heurteauville.

Population

Places of interest

 The church of St. Andre, dating from the eleventh century.

See also
Communes of the Seine-Maritime department

References

Communes of Seine-Maritime